Giuseppina Torello (born 3 July 1943) is a former Italian female middle-distance runner and cross-country runner who competed at individual senior level at the World Athletics Cross Country Championships (1973).

National titles
She won two national championships at individual senior level.
Italian Athletics Indoor Championships
1500 m: 1972, 1973

References

External links
 

1943 births
Living people
Italian female middle-distance runners
Italian female cross country runners
People from Vicoforte
Sportspeople from the Province of Cuneo